Asbeco is a populated place in the east of Guam. It is located on the central east coast, in the village of Mangilao, due east of the capital, Hagåtña.

References 

Populated places in Guam